The 2010–11 Missouri State Bears basketball team represented Missouri State University during the 2010–11 NCAA Division I men's basketball season. The Bears, led by third year head coach Cuonzo Martin, played their home games at JQH Arena and are members of the Missouri Valley Conference. They finished the season 26–9, 15–3 in Missouri Valley play to win the regular season conference championship. They lost in the championship game of the 2011 Missouri Valley Conference men's basketball tournament. As a regular season conference champion who failed to win their conference tournament, they received an automatic bid in the 2011 National Invitation Tournament where they defeated Murray State in the first round before falling in the second round to Miami (FL).

Roster

Schedule
 
|-
!colspan=9 style=| Exhibition

|-
!colspan=9 style=| Regular season

|-
!colspan=9 style=| Missouri Valley tournament

|-
!colspan=9 style=| 2011 NIT

References

Missouri State
Missouri State
Missouri State Bears basketball seasons